Armsia is a genus of small, air-breathing, land snails, terrestrial pulmonate gastropod mollusks in the family Amastridae.

Species
Species within the genus Armsia include:
 Armsia petasus

References

 
Amastridae
Taxonomy articles created by Polbot